Stephen Glover may refer to:
 Stephen Glover (columnist) (born 1952), British journalist and columnist for the Daily Mail
 Stephen Glover (antiquary) (1794–1870), English author and antiquary
 Stephen Glover (composer) (1813–1870), composer and teacher
 Stephen Glover (screenwriter) (born 1990), American rapper and television screenwriter
 Steve-O (born 1974), American stunt performer and television personality